Ohio's 2nd senatorial district has historically represented areas located in northwestern Ohio. It now stretches along the Great Lakes.  A multi-county district, it currently comprises the counties of Erie, Ottawa and Wood, as well as, portions of the counties of Fulton and Lucas.  It encompasses Ohio House of Representatives districts 3, 47 and 89. It has a Cook PVI of R+1.  The seat has been held by Theresa Gavarone following her appointment in  February 2019.

The district was represented by the Ohio Senate President from 1981 to 1982 and from 1985 to 1988 by Senator Paul Gillmor.

List of senators

References

External links
Ohio's 2nd district senator at the 130th Ohio General Assembly official website

Ohio State Senate districts